Prins (Dutch: Prince) is a Dutch surname. In 2007, Prins was the 48th most common surname in the Netherlands (15,361 people). The surname does not derive from an ancestor who was a prince. Instead, the original may have lived in or worked at a location, like a windmill or inn, with that name, or was called "the prince" as a nickname. Historical records note Sephardic Italian Jewish surname of Principe or Prinzi later being changed to the more locally accepted Prins (and then Prince once in England or Colonial America).

People with the name Prins include:

Ada Prins (1879-1977), Dutch chemist
A. H. J. Prins (1921–2000), Dutch Africanist and maritime anthropologist
 (1845–1919), Belgian jurist and criminologist
Alwin de Prins (born 1978), Luxembourgish swimmer
Anna Prins (born 1991), American basketball player
Anthony Winkler Prins (1817–1903), author of Winkler Prins a Dutch encyclopedia
 (1816–1867), Dutch jurist and politician, twice interim Governor General of the Dutch East Indies
Benjamin Prins (1860–1934), Dutch genre painter
Celine Prins (born 11984), Dutch fashion model
Co Prins (1938–1987), Dutch football player
Dave Prins (born 1968), English darts player
Denise Prins (born 1983), Dutch cricketer
Eliezer Liepman Philip Prins (1835-1915), Dutch merchant
Gert-Jan Prins (born 1961), Dutch musician
Harald Prins (born 1951), Dutch anthropologist in the US
 (1889–1958), Dutch chemist, discovered the Prins reaction
Igor Prins (born 1966), Estonian football player and coach
Jan Prins (1944–2008), Dutch newspaper editor and journalist
Jeanfrançois Prins (born 1967), Belgian jazz guitarist
Johannes Huibert Prins (1757–1806), Dutch painter
 (1814–1898), Dutch theologian
Laurens Prins (born ca. 1640), Dutch buccaneer 
Lodewijk Prins (1913–1999), Dutch chess player
Marie Prins (born 1948), South African botanist
Nomi Prins, American author and journalist
Pierre Prins (1838–1913), French painter
Piet Prins, pen name of Piet Jongeling (1909–1985), Dutch politician and children's book author
Ray Prins (born 1951), Canadian politician
Sharon Prins (born 1988), Dutch darts player
Stanislav Prins (born 1988), Estonian footballer
Stefan Prins (born 1919), Belgian composer and performer
Vernon Prins (1924–2003), Ceylonese cricketer
Yopie Prins (born 1959), English professor

See also 
 
 De Prins (disambiguation)
 Prin (disambiguation)

References

Dutch-language surnames

de:Prins
li:Prins
nl:Prins